Josep Rahola i d'Espona (3 July 1918 – 17 January 2023) was a Spanish engineer and politician. A member of the Republican Left of Catalonia, he served in the Senate from 1979 to 1986.

Rahola died in Fortià on 17 January 2023, at the age of 104.

References

1918 births
2023 deaths
Republican Left of Catalonia politicians
Members of the 1st Senate of Spain
Members of the 2nd Senate of Spain
Men centenarians
Spanish centenarians
Politicians from Barcelona